Wahida Dridi is a Tunisian actress.

Filmography

Cinema 
 2001 : Fatma by Khaled Ghorbal
 2004 : Parole d'hommes by Moez Kamoun
 2005 : The Tiger and the Snow by Roberto Benigni : Salwa

Television 
 2002 : Itr Al Ghadhab by Habib Mselmani
 2003 : Chez Azaïez by Slaheddine Essid
 2004 : Hissabat w Aqabat by Habib Mselmani : Atef Wazzan
 2008 : Choufli Hal (season 5) by Slaheddine Essid
 2009 : Aqfas Bila Touyour by Ezzeddine Harbaoui
 2011 : Portable by Habib Mselmani
 2012 : Pour les beaux yeux de Catherine by Hamadi Arafa : Khadija
 2012 : La Fuite de Carthage (tv movie) by Madih Belaïd
 2013 : Zawja El Khamsa by Habib Mselmani
 2014 : Ikawi Saadek by Oussama Abdelkader
 2014 : Maktoub (season 4) by Sami Fehri : Hedi's mother
 2015 - 2020 : Awled Moufida by Sami Fehri : Moufida
 2018 : Tej El Hadhra by Sami Fehri :  Cherifa
 2021 : Ouled El Ghoul by Mourad Ben Cheikh : El Kemla

Theater 
 2007 : Lella Echarda directed by Wahida Dridi
 2010  : Hi artists !, text by Ba Kamane and directed by Imad Ouaslati
 2015 : The return, text, directed by interprétation and Wahida Dridi

References

External links

Tunisian film actresses
People from Tunis
Living people
20th-century Tunisian actresses
Year of birth missing (living people)